Killian's Angels is an all-female Celtic-influenced band based in Las Vegas, Nevada. Since its start in 2001 the band has recorded two CDs and won national radio honors with King World and Oink Inc., which recognized the band's own interpretation of the Jeopardy! theme song.  The band appears on the soundtrack of the video game Grand Theft Auto IV; their song "The Celtic High Step" is played at a New York beer garden within the game.

The band name comes from Killian's Irish Red lager. Their music style includes rock, folk, country, R&B and pop, all with a Celtic accent.

Band members 

Band members include Beth Mullaney, Dolly Coulter, Ginger Bruner, Lisa Viscuglia and Nannette Fortier, and also features regular guests Adrienne LeFebvre, Brett Barnes, CJ Borden and Rachel Julian Jones.  The band's diverse instrumentation includes violin, tuba, mandolin, tin whistle, guitar, keyboard, harmonica, drums, bodhran, spoons, bass and more.

Beth Mullaney is the band's founder, writer of most of the songs, and lead vocalist, as well as playing guitar and mandolin. Ginger Bruner plays bass guitar, tuba, and sings.  Lisa Viscuglia plays violin. Dolly Coulter does vocals, guitars, and keyboards. Former member Satomi Hofmann, who appears on both Killian's Angels CDs, played guitars, and piano, as well as alternating lead vocals with Mullaney and Coulter. Nannette Fortier has performed drums, percussion, piano, guitar, and tin whistle with Killian's Angels since 2003.

Violinist Adrienne LeFebvre appears as a regular guest musician, usually as Viscuglia's substitute, but occasionally with both musicians together. CJ Borden, who does vocals, keyboard, and percussion, has been appearing as a guest with the band since 2004. 

Ginger Bruner, besides playing tuba for Killian's Angels and other bands, is a photographer, recording engineer, and has been a DJ and announcer for KUNV, Nevada Public Radio, for over 20 years. Her other band of note was punk polka "goofcore" band, Tippy Elvis featuring Ginger on the tuba with an odd assortment of lunatics including accordion wielding cartoonist, Sean Jones, and demented attorney/poet Dayvid Figler on vocals.  In August 2006 she was inducted into the Nevada Broadcasters Association Hall of Fame.

Albums 
 Killian's Angels, CD, self-released March 17, 2003.
 The Ladies Room, CD, self-released March 17, 2004.

References
Kristen Peterson, "Band is in millions of homes but not on Wikipedia", Las Vegas Sun, January 13, 2009.

External links
Official site
Las Vegas Sun article on Killian's Angels

Band members' sites 
Beth Mullaney official site
Dolly Coulter official site
Raging Princess Lisa Viscuglia's official site
Satomi Hoffman official site
Nannette Fortier official site
CJ Borden - Singer Songwriter official site

All-female bands
American pop girl groups
Celtic fusion groups
Musical groups from Las Vegas
Rock music groups from Nevada
History of women in Nevada